Sunny Optical Technology (Group) Company Limited, known as Sunny Optical or just Sunny is a Chinese civilian-run enterprise and listed company that produces optical lenses.

Headquartered in Yuyao, Ningbo, Zhejiang Province, Sunny Optical Technology designs, manufactures, and sells optical devices, including lens modules, camera modules, photoelectric vision products, microscopic, analytical and surveying instruments. It is a supplier to major Chinese smartphone brands including Huawei, Oppo and Vivo.

History

Predecessors
According to the company itself, the predecessor of Sunny Optical was founded in October 1984 as Yuyao County Second Optical Instruments Factory in Yuyao County, Zhejiang Province. Since 1985 Yuyao became a county-level city, thus the factory was renamed to Yuyao City Second Optical Instrument Factory . The factory started its partnership with the Zhejiang University in 1988, and renamed as Yuyao City Second Optical Instrument Factory Zhejiang University Optical Instrument Faculty Yuayo Optoelectronic Instrument Factory  in 1989. It was also known as Yuyao Optoelectronic. At that time, the university designed the optics and the factory manufactured them.

In 1993, Yuyao Optoelectronic and other co-founders, incorporated Yuyao City Zhonglida Optoelectronic Company. At that time, Zhonglida was a village collective enterprise. Out of 118 natural person shareholders, only Wang Wenjian and Lu Benxu owned more than 3% stakes at that time. While Yuyao Optoelectronic, owned one-fifth of the share capital of Zhonglida. In 1994 Yuyao Optoelectronic was converted into a joint-stock limited company. The employees of the factory, presented by the staff shareholding committee, owned 52.28% shares of Yuyao Optoelectronic at that time. A subsidiary of the Zhejiang University: Zhejiang University Optoelectronic Technology Development Company, was the second largest shareholder, for 19.44% stake.

After 1996 capital increase, Yuyao Optoelectronic owned 51.06% shares of Zhonglida.

Zhonglida was renamed to Zhejiang Sunny Limited in April 2000. Yuyao Optoelectronic ceased to be the parent company of Zhejiang Sunny in April 2000, sold 51.06% shares of Zhejiang Sunny to the aforementioned Staff Shareholding Committee. Zhejiang Sunny was renamed to Sunny Group Limited in May 2000.

According to media, Wang Wenjian was the founder of the factory in 1984. As of 2018, Wang Wenjian was a Non-Executive Director and the Honorary Chairman of the listed company. Wang Wenjian has no relation to Wang Wenjie, an Executive Director and Standing Vice-President of the company.

Sunny Optical Technology (Group)
The current holding company of the group, Sunny Optical Technology (Group) Company Limited, was incorporated in the Cayman Islands on 21 September 2006, as an exempted company.

Sunny Optical became a listed company in 2007. It  became a component of the blue-chip index the Hang Seng Index in 2017.

Despite often misreported as a supplier of Apple Inc., Sunny Optical is not a supplier of Apple's handset lens supply chain. Analysts of Citigroup also stated Sunny Optical is not interested to join Apple's supply chain, "given its focus on China brands and Samsung so far[.]". It was rumoured that Sunny passed the qualification to be Apple's supplier for 2020.

References

External links
 
 

Optics manufacturing companies
Civilian-run enterprises of China
Companies based in Ningbo
Companies established in 2006
2007 initial public offerings
Companies listed on the Hong Kong Stock Exchange
Offshore companies of the Cayman Islands
Yuyao
Companies associated with Zhejiang University